Joseph Reynolds (September 14, 1785 – September 24, 1864) was an American farmer from New York who served as a brigadier general of state militia troops during the War of 1812, as a judge, and as a U.S. Representative from New York for one term from 1835 to 1837.

Biography 
Born in Easton in Washington County, New York, Reynolds completed academic studies. He moved to Virgil, New York, in 1809, and engaged in agricultural pursuits.

Early career 
He organized a company of riflemen for service in the War of 1812, and served as a major, colonel, and brigadier general in the State troops.
He was a Justice of the Peace 1815–1837, and was a member of the New York State Assembly in 1819.

He served as judge of Cortland County 1821–1839, and as supervisor of the town of Cortlandville 1825–1835.

Congress 
Reynolds was elected as a Jacksonian to the Twenty-fourth Congress (March 4, 1835 – March 3, 1837).

Later career and death 
He was elected the first president of the village of Cortland, New York in 1864. He died in Cortland on September 24, 1864, and was interred in the Cortland Rural Cemetery.

Sources

External links

 

1785 births
1864 deaths
Members of the New York State Assembly
New York (state) state court judges
United States Army generals
Jacksonian members of the United States House of Representatives from New York (state)
19th-century American politicians
Members of the United States House of Representatives from New York (state)